Hangzhou Zoo is a zoo in Hangzhou, Zhejiang province, China.

External links

Hangzhou Zoo website (Chinese)
https://archive.today/20121129015025/http://monkey.ioz.ac.cn/bwg-cciced/english/bwg-cciced/tech-21.htm
http://www.hudong.com/wiki/%E6%9D%AD%E5%B7%9E%E5%8A%A8%E7%89%A9%E5%9B%AD (Chinese) 
http://westlake.hang-zhou.net/hangzhou-zoo.html
https://web.archive.org/web/20090222115207/http://www.hangzhou.com.cn/20040101/ca519428.htm
http://www.inhangzhou.com/hangzhou/?p=2308
https://web.archive.org/web/20110723122422/http://www.lotour.com/member/travel/13401/product-225822.html
https://web.archive.org/web/20110707014052/http://eng.bornforsports.com.cn/index/addcomment/categid/24/subcategid/107/club_id/1407/
http://www.tefl.com.cn/article/article_show.asp?ArticleID=2907 

Zoos in China
Buildings and structures in Hangzhou
Tourist attractions in Hangzhou
Articles needing infobox zoo